The Federal Department of Foreign Affairs (FDFA), so named since 1979, is one of the seven Departments of the Swiss government federal administration of Switzerland, and corresponds in its range of tasks to the ministry of foreign affairs in other countries. The department is always headed by one of the members of the Swiss Federal Council. As of 1 November 2017, the department is headed by Federal Councillor  Ignazio Cassis.

Former names
 1848–1887: Federal Political Department
 1888–1895: Federal Department of the Exterior
 1896–1978: Federal Political Department

Mission
The mission of the FDFA is to safeguard Switzerland's interests abroad and its relations with other countries. It does so by means of Swiss Foreign Policy, whose objectives have been laid down in Art. 54 para. 2 of the Federal Constitution (BV) as follows:

The Confederation shall strive to preserve the independence of Switzerland and its welfare; it shall, in particular, contribute to alleviate need and poverty in the world, and to promote respect for human rights, democracy, the peaceful coexistence of nations and the preservation of natural resources.

The priorities of Swiss Foreign Policy for the years 2012–2015 include:

 Fostering and cultivating Swiss relations with its neighbouring countries and the European Union (EU);
 Strengthening Switzerland's commitment to stability in Europe and in the world;
 Intensifying and diversifying strategic partnerships and Switzerland's multilateral commitment; and 
 Enhancing the support and offering of services provided to Swiss citizens abroad.

Originally it was the rotating Swiss president who headed the "Political Department" (PD) for a one-year term. In 1888, the department was restructured by Numa Droz, who straight away headed the department for five years. In 1896, the Federal Council returned to the original system with a federal councillor heading the department only for a given one-year term. The one-year limitation was abandoned in 1914. Since 1979, the department has retained the name by which it still goes today.

Organization
 General Secretariat 
 Presence Switzerland
 State Secretariat 
 Presidential Affairs and Protocol
 Crisis Management Centre
 Directorate of Political Affairs 
 Europe, Central Asia, Council of Europe, OSCE Division
 Middle East and North Africa Division
 Subsaharan Africa and Francophonie Division if
 Asia and the Pacific Division
 Americas Division
 United Nations and International Organisations
 Human Security Division
 Sectoral Foreign Policy Division
 Division for Security Policy
 Directorate of European Affairs, DEA
 Directorate of Corporate Resources (DR)
 Consular Directorate CD
 Directorate of International Law DIL
 Swiss Agency for Development and Cooperation (SDC)

List of heads of department

See also 
 Foreign relations of Switzerland
 Protecting power

References

External links 
 www.eda.admin.ch
 Swiss embassies and representations abroad
 Diplomatic Documents of Switzerland
 FDFA Publications
 FDFA on Social Media
 The Swiss Confederation a brief guide

 
Foreign Affairs
Switzerland
Foreign relations of Switzerland
Switzerland, Foreign Affairs
1848 establishments in Switzerland